Chubritza may refer to:

In Bulgarian cuisine, Chubritza is the Bulgarian word for Summer savory, widely used as an herb

music groups performing Bulgarian Folk Music
 Chubritza (band), a California band
 Čubrica (ensemble) a Dutch ensemble